"There Must Be More to Love Than This" is a 1970 single by Jerry Lee Lewis. It was Lewis's fourth number one on the U.S. country music chart. The single spent two weeks at the top spot and a total of fourteen weeks on the chart.

Charts

Weekly charts

Year-end charts

References

Jerry Lee Lewis songs
1970 singles
1970 songs
Mercury Records singles